The Orotava Valley is an area in the northern part of the island of Tenerife, Canary Islands, Spain. The valley measures 10 km by 11 km, and stretches from the north coast to about 2,000 m elevation, at the northern foot of Pico del Teide. To the west and east, the valley is delimited by two steep escarpments, respectively the Ladera de Tigaiga and the Ladera de Santa Ursula. The Orotava valley formed as the result of a large landslide some 560,000 years ago. The valley takes its name from La Orotava, the largest town in the area. Other towns are Los Realejos and Puerto de la Cruz. In the era of the Guanches, before the conquest by the Spanish in 1496, the valley was known as Taoro.

References

External links

Geography of Tenerife
Valleys of Spain